Motivator is a source of motivation. It may also refer to:

 Motivator (horse), winner of the 2005 Epsom Derby
 Motivator-Hygiene theory, combination of factors for workplace satisfaction
 MOS Motivator, a container ship
 Mr Motivator, the persona of fitness trainer Derrick Errol Evans

See also
 MotivAider, an electronic behavior change device